The Navy Operational Global Atmospheric Prediction System (NOGAPS) is a global numerical weather prediction computer model run by the United States Navy's Fleet Numerical Meteorology and Oceanography Center.  This mathematical model was run four times a day and produced weather forecasts.  The NOGAPS was replaced by the NAVGEM in February 2013.

References

External links 
 FNMOC Portal

Naval meteorology
Numerical climate and weather models
Weather prediction